Montana Levi Blanco (born April 25, 1984) is an American costume designer. He won a  Tony Award in the category Best Costume Design in a Play for the play The Skin of Our Teeth.

References

External links 

1984 births
Living people
People from Albuquerque, New Mexico
American costume designers
Tony Award winners
American theatre people
Oberlin Conservatory of Music alumni
Brown University alumni
Yale School of Drama alumni